Marcelo Guilherme de Aro Ferreira (born 12 June 1987) better known as simply Marcelo Aro is a Brazilian politician and journalist. He has spent his political career representing Minas Gerais, having served as state representative since 2015.

Personal life
Aro was born to Jose Guilherme Ferreira Filho and Marli Aparecida de Aro. Prior to becoming a politician Aro worked as a journalist.

Political career
At the age of just 25, Aro was voted into the city council of his home city with 9,412 in the 2012 local election.

Aro voted in favor of the impeachment motion of then-president Dilma Rousseff. Aro would vote against a similar corruption investigation into Rousseff's successor Michel Temer, and he voted in favor of the 2017 Brazilian labor reforms.

In January 2018 Aro became the president of the Humanist Party of Solidarity. After the 2018 Brazilian general election however the Humanist party failed to win enough seats to secure funding, and subsequently merged with the Podemos party. In January of the following year Aro joined the Progressive party.

References

1987 births
Living people
People from Belo Horizonte
Brazilian journalists
Humanist Party of Solidarity politicians
Progressistas politicians
Members of the Chamber of Deputies (Brazil) from Minas Gerais